Ilaban Natin 'Yan! is a 2020 Philippine television dramatized tabloid talk show broadcast by GMA Network. Directed by Monti Puno Parungao, Armin Collado and Ralph Errald Manuel Malabunga, it is hosted by Vicky Morales. It premiered on February 22, 2020 on the network's Sabado Star Power sa Hapon line up replacing Wish Ko Lang!. The show concluded on April 4, 2020 with a total of 7 episodes. It was replaced by Wish Ko Lang! in its timeslot.

Episodes

Production
In March 2020, principal photography was halted due to the enhanced community quarantine in Luzon caused by the COVID-19 pandemic.

References

2020 Philippine television series debuts
2020 Philippine television series endings
Filipino-language television shows
GMA Network original programming
GMA Integrated News and Public Affairs shows
Philippine television shows
Television productions suspended due to the COVID-19 pandemic
Philippine television talk shows